Duearity is a Swedish medical technology company based in Malmö. The company specialises in hardware and software for tinnitus treatment. As of May 2021, Duearity is a public company listed on the Nasdaq First North stock exchange.

Origins
Peter Arndt, one of Duearity's founders, was undergoing tinnitus retraining therapy (TRT) and noticed the treatment to be effective, but incompatible with daily life. Tinnitus retraining therapy is based on cognitive behavioral therapy and requires white noise to be played uninterrupted for 6-8 hours per day for 6-24 months. Wearing headphones for prolonged and uninterrupted period of time was interfering with work during daytime and with sleep during nighttime. 

The founders set out to find a solution that did not require headphones and did not occupy the ear canals. In 2020, a proof of concept was successfully completed and the company applied for a patent.

IPO
On 11 May 2021, the company's shares debuted on Nasdaq First North under ticker symbol DEAR. The company was previously called Cochlearity, but the name was changed pre-IPO in order to avoid mixup with another medtech company.

75,3% of the IPO shares were subscribed before the IPO offer was made public. Duearity’s IPO was oversubscribed by 9 times.

Products and market
Duearity is focusing its products on white noise and tinnitus retraining therapy, which has been shown to be effective in a variety of research studies.

Since 2020, Duearity has been developing the world's smallest and most flexible tinnitus aid that emits white noise through bone conduction technology. It is a patented medtech CE class IIa product.  It is a non-invasive device that attaches behind the ears and keeps the ear canals free. The device will be launched in Europe once it receives a CE marking and in the USA once it receives FDA approval.

Duearity is also developing a patented software solution for analysing tinnitus and managing its symptoms. The company observes strong interest in the solution from researchers, audiologists and otorhinolaryngologists. As of 2022, it is not yet available on the market.

References

External links 
 Official website

Further reading 
 Clinical research on Tinnitus retraining therapy
 Latest annual report (2021)
 IPO prospectus (2021)
 Patent application SE 2030236 A1

See also
 Zwicker tone
 Tinnitus
 Hearing aid
 Tinnitus masker
 List of people with tinnitus

Companies listed on Nasdaq Nordic
Companies listed on Nasdaq Stockholm
Medical device manufacturers
Medical and health organizations based in Sweden
Medical technology companies of Sweden
Medical equipment
Hearing aid manufacturers
Companies based in Malmö
Organizations based in Malmö
Organizations based in Sweden
Swedish brands